Thomas "Tommy" Armstrong (15 August 1848 – 30 August 1920) was an English, County Durham-based concert hall songwriter, and performer in the late 19th century. His most famous song is arguably "Wor Nanny’s a mazer".  He was known as "The Pitman Poet" or "The Bard of the Northern Coalfield".

Early life 
Tommy Armstrong was born in Wood Street, Shotley Bridge, County Durham, on 15 August 1848. Armstrong was of very short stature, and very bow legged (thought to be caused by rickets when young) and this caused him to have problems all his life, including using a walking stick when older.
He started work in the mines at the age of nine as a trapper boy, and at the age of 12 had progressed to a "pony boy". He worked at various collieries in the area including Tanfield Lea colliery, near Stanley, and also worked at the collieries at Addison, East Tanfield, and Tanfield Moor.

Later life 
Tommy Armstrong  was married in 1869 to a Mary Ann Hunter in 1869 and they had 14 children. Ann died in 1898 and Tommy remarried in 1901 to a widow named Ann Thompson. He lived most of his life at Tanfield Lea, although he is known to have also lived in East Tanfield, Iveston, Tanfield, Tantobie and Whitley Bay.

A book of 26 of his popular songs was published but it is thought that much of his work was lost. His works were printed at the time on chapbooks and broadsheets which sold for a halfpenny or a penny each. He moved for a time in 1902 to Whitley Bay where he worked for a period as a newsagent. He died on 30 August 1920 at the age of 72 years at Havelock Terrace, Tantobie.

Works 
The material varies between the humorous "Wor Nanny’s a mazer" to the attack on "Dirty Kaiser Bill". Many told of the times, the hunger suffered by many with "The Cat Pie" and "The Hedgehog Pie", of the disasters with "The Consett Choir Calamity" after the charabanc crash of Saturday 26 August 1911, and "The Trimdon Grange Explosion" of 16 February 1882 in which 68 miners died, of the hard times and conditions with "The Durham Lockout", "Oakey’s Keeker" and "The Oakey Strike Evictions" and back to the humour with "Funny Nuaims It Tanfeeld" and the various club outing tales. "Stanla Market" and "The Nue Ralewae Te Anfeeld Plane" tell about the area.

Taken as a whole, the collection of songs become a social history of the times as well as a feast of dialect materials

Selected songs
Blanchland Murder, (The)
Bobby En Bet
Borth E Th' Lad, (Th') – (or The Birth of the Lad)
Cat Pie, (The)
Consett Choir Calamity, (The) – (of Saturday 26 August 1911)
Corry’s Rat
Dorham Jail – (or Durham Gaol)
Durham Strike, (The) – (more correctly The Durham Lock-out)
Funny Nuaims It Tanfeeld Pit – (or The funny names of the folk at Tanfield)
Gateshead Poor Children's Trip To Stanley
Geordie Broon
Ghost Thit' Anted Bunty, (The) – (or The Ghost that Haunted Bunty)
Hedgehog Pie, (The)
Jack Reckonen – (or Jack’s Reckoning)
Kaiser And The War, (The)
Kelloe Disaster
Marla Hill Ducks – (or Marley Hill Ducks)
Murder of Mary Donnelly
Neglectful Sally
Nue Ralewae Te Anfeeld Plane, (Th')  – (or The new railway to Annfield Plain)
Oakey’s Keeker
Oakey’s Strike – (or The Oakey Strike Evictions)
Old Dolly Cook and Her Family
Old Folks Tea at West Stanley
Old Men’s Trip, (The) – From the Victoria Club, West Stanley
Picture Hall at Tantobie, (The)
Poam To The Kaiser, (A)
Prudent Pitman, (The)
Row Between Th' Cages, (Th'), – (or The Row ‘Atween the Cages)
Row I' Th' Guuttor, (Th')
Sewing Meeting, (A)
Sheel Raw Flud, (The)
Skeul Bord Man, (Th') – (or The Skuil (or school) Board Man
Sooth Medomsley Strike, (The) – (or The South Medomsley Strike)
Stanla Market – (or Stanley Market)
Summer Flies, (The)
Tanfeeld Lee Silvor Modil Band – (ot The Tanfield Lea Silver Model Band)
Tanfield Braike
Tantobie Wednesday Football Team
Tantobie Workmen's Club Oxo Banquet
Tommy The Poet Signed On
Trimdon Grange Explosion, (The) – (or The Trimdon Grange Disaster)
Trip From Tantobie Union Club to Jarrow Excelsior Club, (The)
Unhappy Couple, (The)
Wheelbarrow Man, (Th')
Wor Nanny's a mazer (alternately spelt mazer, mazor, maisor, maizor, etc.)

See also 
 Geordie dialect words

References

External links 
 The Tommy Armstrong Society
 Sunniside History Society
 The Bards of Newcastle

English folk singers
English songwriters
People from Newcastle upon Tyne (district)
Musicians from Tyne and Wear
1920 deaths
1848 births
Geordie songwriters
19th-century English singers
People from Shotley Bridge